Athlone is a town on the border of County Roscommon and County Westmeath, Ireland. It is located on the River Shannon near the southern shore of Lough Ree. It is the second most populous town in the Midlands Region with a population of 21,349 in the 2016 census.

Most of the town lies on the east bank of the river, within the townland of the same name; however, by the terms of the Local Government Act of 1898, six townlands on the west bank of the Shannon, formerly in County Roscommon, were incorporated into the town, and consequently, into the county of Westmeath.

History

Athlone Castle, situated on the western bank of the River Shannon, is the geographical and historical centre of Athlone. Throughout its early history, the ford of Athlone was strategically important, as south of Athlone the Shannon is impassable until Clonmacnoise, where the Esker Riada meets the Shannon, while to the north the Shannon flows into Lough Ree. In 1001 Brian Bóru sailed his army up river from Kincora and through Lough Derg to attend a gathering in Athlone. The following year, Brian met the High King of Ireland Máel Sechnaill mac Domnaill at Athlone, intending to engage him in a battle for the High Kingship – only to have Máel Sechnaill, abandoned by his kinsmen of the Northern Uí Néill, submit to Brian without a fight.

In 1129, to protect the bridge, the High King Turloch Mór Ó Conor constructed a fort on the river's west bank, within Athlone. On a number of occasions both the fort and bridge were subject to attacks, and towards the end of the 12th century the Anglo-Normans constructed a motte-and-bailey fortification there. This earthen fort was followed by a stone structure built in 1210 by Justiciar John de Gray. The 12-sided donjon, or tower, dates from this time; however, the rest of the original castle was largely destroyed during the 1691 Siege of Athlone and subsequently rebuilt and enlarged.

Throughout the wars that wracked Ireland in the 17th century, Athlone contained the vital, main bridge over the River Shannon into Connacht. During the Irish Confederate Wars (1641–53), the town was held by Irish Confederate troops until it was taken in late 1650 by Charles Coote, who attacked the town from the west, having crossed into Connacht at Sligo.

Forty years later, during the pan-European War of the Grand Alliance (1688–97), the town was again of key strategic importance. In the Irish phase of the conflict (the Williamite War in Ireland of 1688–1691), Athlone was one of the Jacobite strongholds that defended the river-crossings into the Jacobite-held Province of Connacht following the Battle of the Boyne on 1 July 1690. That same year, Colonel Richard Grace's Jacobite forces in Athlone repelled an attack by 10,000 men led by Commander Douglas. In the following year's campaign, the Siege of Athlone saw a further assault by a larger allied force, during which the invading troops of King William and Queen Mary eventually overran the entire city. The defenders were forced to flee further west, toward the River Suck, at such speed that eyewitness accounts record that they "flung their cannons into the morass" as they fled. The most recently discovered account of the Siege of Athlone, written after the attack, on 5 July 1691, was found in 2004 in an archive in the Netherlands. The account was penned by the victorious commanding officer from the Republic of the Seven United Netherlands, general lieutenant Godard van Reede, in letters written to his family in mainland Europe. In the account, the commanding allied officer reported that half of Athlone's defenders retreated westward, towards the rest of their army, leaving almost 2,000 dead within the city walls and more than 100 taken prisoner, including dozens of officers.

Athlone was represented by a two-seat constituency in the Irish House of Commons prior to 1801, and by a one-seat constituency in the United Kingdom House of Commons from 1801 to 1885.

In the 1970s the Republican Éire Nua programme proposed making Athlone the capital of a federal United Ireland.

Location and access

The part of the town that lies east of the Shannon is in the province of Leinster, the county of Westmeath, the barony of Brawny, and the civil parish of St Mary's. Unusually, the barony is coterminous with a single civil parish. In terms of ecclesiastical boundaries, the eastern part of the town is in the Roman Catholic Diocese of Ardagh and Clonmacnoise and the parish of St Mary's. There are several other churches in the town including a Church of Ireland (St. Mary's, Anglican), the St. Peter and St. Pauls, a Franciscan friary and a chapel of the Society of Saint Pius X.

However, seven townlands, or sections of the town, lie west of the Shannon: Athlone and Big Meadow, Bellaugh, Bogganfin, Canal and Banks, Doovoge, part of Monksland, and Ranelagh. Although surrounded by County Roscommon in the province of Connacht, they are designated as part of County Westmeath to preserve the integrity of the town. These townlands lie in St Peter's civil parish in the barony of Athlone South. In terms of ecclesiastical boundaries, the townlands west of the Shannon are part of the Roman Catholic Diocese of Elphin and the parish of Saints Peter and Paul.

River

Athlone is a popular stop for pleasure craft along the River Shannon. Lough Ree, the largest lake on the Shannon, is a short distance upstream from Athlone, and many boat companies are based out of the town. For craft to pass through Athlone, it is necessary to use a lock in the river, which is beside the weir and downstream of the current road bridge. The lock, weir, and bridge were all constructed by the Shannon navigation commissioners in the 1840s. Before then, boats used a canal, about a mile and a half long, to the west of the river. The canal was built by Thomas Omer for the Commissioners of Inland Navigation. Work started in 1757 and involved the work of over 300 men. Omer built a single lock, 120' X 19' with a rise of 4.5', but there was also a guard lock, further upstream, with a single set of gates to protect the canal against floods. There were also two lay-bys, or harbours, one above the lock and another at the upstream end. The old canal is no longer navigable.

Rail
Athlone railway station opened on 3 October 1859, with Irish Rail services travelling eastwards to Portarlington, Kildare and Dublin Heuston and westwards to the Westport/Ballina lines as well as to Athenry, Oranmore and Galway.

Connections from Athlone via a train transfer at Athenry railway station extend to Ennis and Limerick, while a transfer at Portarlington connects Limerick Junction and Limerick. There are trains from Portarlington to Mallow, and from Mallow to Cork, Killarney, Farranfore and Tralee. Travel between Athlone and Killdare enables connections to Carlow, Kilkenny and Waterford.

Bus
For many years state-owned bus operator Bus Éireann provided hourly services to Dublin and Galway from its bus station in Athlone located beside the railway station, but in July 2021 these routes, 20 and X20 Expressway, were cancelled indefinitely. The company cited "continuing losses [..] resulting from the severe impact of the Covid-19 pandemic" as the reason. Bus Éireann services between Dublin and Belfast, Cork and Limerick were also cut following a "viability review" of 18 routes in September 2020. It was noted that from July 2021 onwards, bus journeys between Athlone and Galway, Ballinasloe, Moate, Dublin city or Dublin airport would be operated by private companies only, with passengers being dropped off or picked up at the Arcadia Retail Park and Athlone Institute of Technology rather than the bus station. Such private bus companies that stop in Athlone include Citylink and a new Aircoach bus route (Galway-Athlone-Dublin) which was established soon after Bus Éireann's decision, to cope with the demand.

There are also services to Limerick, Dundalk, Waterford, Cavan, Belfast, Longford and Roscommon. The town is also home to a number of privately operated services, including the Flagline bus company, which operates local bus routes as well as service to Tullamore.

Bus Éireann continues to operate a local Athlone bus service in and around the town. The local services are as follows: Route A1: Bus Station, Willow Park (Norwood Court) via Golden Island Shopping Centre, Dublin Road and Athlone Institute of Technology; and Route A2: Monksland (River Village); Garrycastle (Moydrum Road) via Galway Road, St. Peter's Avenue, Saint Anne's Terrace, the Batteries, Connaught Street, Northgate Street, Bus Station, Golden Island Shopping Centre, Dublin Road and Athlone Institute of Technology.

Road
The town is located alongside the N6 dual carriageway, which is effectively a section of the M6 motorway connecting Galway to Dublin. The N6 passes along the northern side of the town, crossing the River Shannon into County Roscommon. A number of national secondary roads connect Athlone with other towns and regions, namely the N55 to Ballymahon and Cavan, the N61 to Roscommon and the N62 to Birr, Roscrea, and Southern Ireland.

Culture
Theatres in Athlone include the Dean Crowe Theatre & Arts Centre and the Little Theatre.

RTÉ All-Ireland Drama Festival takes place annually in Athlone, bringing together nine amateur drama groups from across Ireland. The festival is supported by an active fringe which involves street theatre, art exhibitions, workshops and events for young people.

Athlone Literary Festival is an annual event which began in 1999, originally as a weekend celebration of the life and works of John Broderick, but which now features a great variety of speakers and debaters.

Count John McCormack was born in Athlone, and for many years, an annual festival held in the town has celebrated this world-renowned tenor.

Athlone School of Music opened in 2005 and is a grant-aided project aimed at developing music education and services in the Midlands region.

Abbey Road Artists' Studios launched in 2011 in a unique building constructed in 1841. The studios offer a dedicated space in Athlone for local and visiting artists. The artists' studios consist of four individual artists' studios as well as a large multi-purpose upstairs space suitable for a variety of community cultural events, including exhibitions, performances, workshops and seminars. The Abbey Road artists' studios work closely with the Luan Art Gallery.

In 1954, Athlone became the first branch of the Inland Waterways Association of Ireland and the town had a large part in the organisation's creation.

Literature
American crime writer James M. Cain refers to Athlone in his 1937 book, Serenade, in a passage where two characters discuss tenor John McCormack:
"--There's the language he was born to. John McCormack comes from Dublin".
"He does not. He comes from Athlone".
"Didn't he live in Dublin?".
"No Matter. They speak a fine brogue in Athlone, almost as fine as in Belfast".
"It's a fine brogue, but it's not brogue. It's the English language as it was spoken before all the other countries of the world forgot how to speak it. There are two things a singer can't buy, beg or steal, and that no teacher, coach or conductor can give him. One is his voice, the other is the language that was born in his mouth. When McCormack was singing Handel he was singing English, and he sings it as no American and no Englishman will ever sing English".

The Irish poet Aubrey Thomas de Vere wrote a poem The Ballad of Athlone which is an account of an incident in the 1691 siege.

Tourism and amenities
The promenade on the River Shannon is popular among anglers, birdwatchers and swimmers. The lakeshore is accessed from Coosan Point and Hodson Bay. The town is also home to Lough Ree Yacht Club.
Athlone is a major retail destination within the Midlands region of Ireland. The town centre extends from Church Street in the west to Seán Costello Street in the east. Located centrally is the Athlone Town Centre, a shopping centre built in 2007, containing 54 shops, cafés and a four-star hotel.

The Golden Island Shopping Centre, which opened in 1997, is also located in the town centre.

Athlone has a number of hotels, including chains such the Radisson Blu and Sheraton hotels, as well as a number of locally owned ones.

Athlone Regional Sports Centre, developed by the former Town Council in 2002, is located on the outskirts of the town. The facility contains a swimming pool, gym and AstroTurf pitches.

Burgess Park stands near the centre of the town, on the banks of the River Shannon.

Sean's Bar, located on the west bank of the river, is certified by the Guinness Book of World Records as the oldest pub in Ireland.

Athlone Castle is open to the public as a museum.

The Luan Gallery was opened in 2012. It is the first purpose-built, modern visual art gallery in the Midlands. It was designed by Keith Williams, who also designed the Athlone Town Civic Centre. The gallery was opened by Jimmy Deenihan, the Minister for Arts, Heritage and the Gaeltacht. The Luan Gallery opened with an exhibition from the Irish Museum of Modern Art, featuring the work of several national and international artists.

Other attractions include the Glendeer Open Farm and the Viking Cruise of the Shannon. Baysports, a boat training and watersports centre with the world's largest floating inflatable water slide, is located a ten-minute drive from the town. There is a tourist office on Church Street.

There are many fine golf courses within easy reach of Athlone including Athlone Golf Club, Glasson Golf & Country Club and Mount Temple Golf Club.

Greenway

 The Old Rail Trail greenway runs for 42 kilometres from Athlone to Mullingar, along the disused Athlone-Mullingar Railway. It will eventually form part of the Dublin-Galway Greenway. A new cycle and pedestrian bridge over the River Shannon is planned to be built beside the Luan Gallery.

Education and industry

Athlone's major employers include Alkermes, a pharmaceutical company that succeeded Elan in Athlone; Bioclin Laboratories, another pharmaceutical company; Ericsson, a telecommunications business; Tyco Healthcare, a medical equipment supplier; Utah Medical, another medical equipment supplier; Pharmaplaz, another pharmaceutical company; Alienware, a computer hardware business; ICT Eurotel, a contact centre; and Athlone Extrusions, a polymer supplier.

Athlone is the regional centre for a large number of state-run and semi-state-run organisations. The Department of Education, State Examinations Commission, Revenue Commissioners, FÁS Midlands Region, Bus Éireann, Iarnród Éireann, IDA Ireland and Enterprise Ireland all have bases in the town. Athlone is also a major Irish military centre, as the Custume Barracks, which lie on the west bank of the Shannon in the town, is the headquarters of the Western Command of the Irish Army.

The Athlone Institute of Technology (AIT) is a constituent institute of the Technological University of the Shannon: Midlands Midwest, (TUS). Athlone forms part of the Midlands Gateway, an in-progress infrastructure initiative, along with Mullingar and Tullamore. The AIT has a campus size of 44 acres, and has new, purpose-built facilities include the Hospitality, Tourism and Leisure Studies building, built in 2003; the Nursing and Health Science building, built in 2005; the Midlands Innovation and Research Centre, also built in 2005; the Engineering and Informatics building, built in 2010; and the Postgraduate Research Hub, also built in 2010. RTÉ's Midlands studio and office are located at AIT.

The Athlone Institute of Technology has memorandum of understanding with the Rio de Janeiro State University, one of the largest universities in the Brazilian city. AIT also has agreements with the Pontifical Catholic University of Minas Gerais, one of the largest Brazilian private universities. The institute also founded agreements with two leading Beijing universities, the Capital University of Economics and Business and the Beijing Union University. The agreements were signed by the Chinese Ambassador to Ireland and university representatives. Other agreements exist between the AIT and TVTC, in Saudi Arabia, and a memorandum of understanding exists with the Georgia Institute of Technology. Further agreements exist with the Bharati Vidyapeeth, one of the largest universities in India.

There are four major secondary schools in the Athlone area, the Athlone Community College, a coeducational school; Our Lady's Bower School, a girls' school; Marist College, a boys' school; Coláiste Chiaráin, the new secondary school resulting from the amalgamation of St. Aloysius' College and St Joseph's College, Summerhill.

In June 2010, Taoiseach Brian Cowen announced his support of a proposed European and Chinese training hub in Athlone. In May 2012, the project was granted permission by An Bord Pleanála. It was planned to comprise a total of nine exhibition halls, nine smaller independent exhibition buildings, one temporary exhibition space, several offices, administrative services, some living quarters, hotels, shops, restaurants, pubs, a school and railway station. It was never built.

Broadcasting

Between 1931 and 1975 the main radio transmission centre for Irish radio was located at Moydrum, Athlone. The original call sign was 2RN, a wordplay on the song "Come back to Erin". The station subsequently became known as "Radio Athlone" and could clearly be heard throughout Europe, and as far away as Moscow. This changed as bandwidth allocations were accorded at the Helsinki Declaration.

The station originally operated at a power of 60 kW, which during the 1950s, was increased to 100 kW. For an antenna, a T-antenna was and is still used, which spins between two 100-metre tall guyed masts with square cross-sections and which are insulated against ground. Many old radio sets in Europe had the "Athlone" dial position marked near the end of their tuning scales.

In the late 1970s the station reopened on a new dial position of 612 kHz for "Radio 2", later known as RTÉ 2fm. Moydrum was also the location of Ireland's short-lived Shortwave international radio service, which was closed down in 1948 due to lack of money. Today, RTÉ's Midlands studios are located in Athlone, at St. Mary's Square. The local radio station is Midlands 103. Many also tune into the Shannonside station.

A radio station, i102-104FM, was launched in 2008, geared to the 15–34 age group of the Midlands and Northeast.

The Athlone Community Taskforce and several members of the Roscommon community radio station, RosFM, have begun broadcasting from the Athlone area under the banner of Athlone Community Radio. Their first broadcast was on 15 March 2008 and the broadcasts were originally set to run every Saturday and Sunday for the following 15 weeks, until their temporary licence expired. They received a 10-year licence on 14 January 2011 from the Broadcasting Authority of Ireland, and they currently broadcast on the frequency of 88.4 FM.

Print
Local newspapers include the Westmeath Independent located on Sean Costello Street which was established in 1846 and the Athlone Topic.

Sport

In addition to being home to the Athlone Regional Sports Centre, the town has a variety of sporting organisations. Namely, there is the Athlone Town Football Club, who play their home games at Athlone Town Stadium in Lissywollen, an arena with a 5,000 person capacity. The Athlone Town Football Club won the League of Ireland Championship in 1981 and 1983, as well as the FAI Cup in 1924. The team also qualified for the 1975–76 UEFA Cup, where they played 0–0 against AC Milan.

The newly opened, ten million Euro, Athlone IT International Arena, is now Ireland's first world-class indoor athletics arena, boasting a floor space of nearly 10,000 square metres. The arena was opened by Taoiseach Enda Kenny, and has been admired by sporting legends such as Sonia O'Sullivan. It has also hailed by Senator Eamonn Coghlan as the "best news story in Irish athletics history". The stadium hosts the annual AIT Grand Prix event, broadcast by TG4 on the Island of Ireland and internationally via Vinco and Runnerspace.

Athlone hosted the European Triathlon Championships in 2010 when approximately 5,000 athletes participated in the event. Alistair Brownlee of Great Britain won the event. Two years later he won a gold medal in the triathlon at the 2012 Summer Olympics in London.

Athlone is home to several Gaelic football teams, including Tubberclair GAA, Garrycastle GAA, and Athlone GAA, with St. Brigids (Roscommon) GAA and Clann na nGael GAA being located outside Athlone itself. Garrycastle GAA qualified for the 2012 All-Ireland Senior Club Football Championship for the first time in the club's history by beating Connacht Champions, St. Brigids GAA, in an all-Athlone semi-final. Garrycastle eventually lost the final to Crossmaglen Rangers in a replay of the final, the first match having ended in a draw by a scoreline of 1–12 to 0–15.

Athlone is also home to Buccaneers RFC, whose club's grounds are at Dubarry Park. Dubarry Park, with a 10,000 person capacity, is also home to the Connacht Eagles, the team that represents Connacht in the British and Irish Cup and in the All Ireland Inter-provincial Championship.

The European Capital of Sport awarded Athlone the title of European Town of Sport for 2013.

People

The Earls of Athlone 
Pat Barlow, (1914–1986) professional footballer.
Robbie Benson, (b.1992) professional footballer.
Paul Brock, (b.1989) accordionist.
John Broderick, (1924–1989) Irish novelist.
James J. Browne, former president of the National University of Ireland, Galway (2008–2018)
Jack Carty (b.1992) Connaught and Ireland rugby union player
Michael Joseph Curley, (1879–1947) Catholic Archbishop and educationalist.
Stephen Donohoe, (b.1984) jockey and sailor.
Thomas Duffy, (1806-1868) recipient of the Victoria Cross.
Lisa Dwan, (b.1977) actress.
Jimmy Elliott, (1838–1883) Irish-American world heavyweight boxing champion from 1865 to 1868.
Thomas Flynn, (1842–1892) an Irish recipient of the Victoria Cross.
John Ellard Gore, (1845–1910) astronomer one of the founding members of British Astronomical Association.
Robbie Henshaw, (b.1993) Irish rugby union player.
Henry Kelly, (b.1946) journalist and television presenter, born in Athlone.
Ralph Kenna, (b.1964) physicist, born in Athlone.
Declan Lynch, (b.1961) novelist and playwright.
David Madigan, (b.1962) statistician.
John McCormack, (1884-1945) tenor.
Nicky McFadden, (1962–2014) Teachta Dála.
Seán McLoughlin, (b.1990) YouTube game commentator known by the name of Jacksepticeye.
Stefan Molyneux, (b.1966) far-right podcaster and YouTuber.
T. P. O'Connor, (1848–1929) journalist and Member of Parliament.
Caroline O'Donnell, (b.1974) architect and author.
Mary O'Rourke, (b.1937) a politician of various ministry roles and an author.
Feargal O'Rourke, (b.1964) accountant and taxation pioneer.
Richard Rothwell, (1800–1868) a nineteenth-century Irish portrait and genre painter.
Marcus Seoige, (b.1976) actor.
Brendan Shine, (b.1947) folk/country singer.
George Thomas Stokes, (1843–1898) ecclesiastical historian.

Sister cities
  Athlone, Victoria, Australia

Twin towns
Chateaubriant, France

See also
 Athlone Pursuivant
 Corlea Trackway
 List of towns and villages in the Republic of Ireland
 List of market houses in the Republic of Ireland
 Midland Railway Action Group

Notes and references

External links
 
 
 Athlone.ie – Official Town Portal

 

 
Populated places on the River Shannon
Towns and villages in County Westmeath